is a current professional basketball head coach for Akita Northern Happinets in Japan and the former bench boss for the Takamatsu Five Arrows of the bj league. He also served as a support coach/translator for the Japan national basketball team.

College statistics

|-
| style="text-align:left;"| 2004-05
| style="text-align:left;"| UNK
| 11 ||0  ||5.1  || .167 || .125 || .000|| 0.3 ||0.27  || 0.09 || 0.0 || 0.5
|-
| style="text-align:left;"| 2005-06
| style="text-align:left;"| UNK
| 12 ||0  ||3.0  || .111 || .200 || .000|| 0.0 ||0.25  || 0.08 || 0.0 || 0.3
|-

Source

Head coaching record

|- 
| style="text-align:left;"|Takamatsu
| style="text-align:left;"|2011-12
| 52||2||50|||| style="text-align:center;"|9th in Western|||-||-||-||
| style="text-align:center;"|Missed playoffs
|-
| style="text-align:left;"|Takamatsu
| style="text-align:left;"|2012-13
|52||20||32|||| style="text-align:center;"|9th in Western|||-||-||-||
| style="text-align:center;"|Missed playoffs
|-
| style="text-align:left;"|Takamatsu
| style="text-align:left;"|2013-14
| 52||23||29|||| style="text-align:center;"|7th in Western|||—||—||—||—
| style="text-align:center;"|Missed playoffs
|-
| style="text-align:left;"|Takamatsu
| style="text-align:left;"|2014-15
| 52||17||35|||| style="text-align:center;"|8th in Western|||2||0||2||
| style="text-align:center;"|Lost in First Round
|-
| style="text-align:left;"|Akita
| style="text-align:left;"|2019-20
| 41||19||22|||| style="text-align:center;"| 5th in Eastern|||-||-||-||
| style="text-align:center;"|Canceled
|-
| style="text-align:left;"|Akita
| style="text-align:left;"|2020-21
| 59||28||31|||| style="text-align:center;"| 7th in Eastern|||-||-||-||
| style="text-align:center;"|Missed playoffs
|-
|- class="sortbottom"
! style="text-align:center;" colspan="2" | Career
! 308||109||199|||| ||2||0||2||||

Personal life
Maeda has been married to Natsumi, and they have three sons.

References

External link

1982 births
Living people
Akita Northern Happinets coaches
Bellevue University alumni
Japanese basketball coaches
Kagawa Five Arrows coaches
Nebraska–Kearney Lopers men's basketball players
Sportspeople from Osaka Prefecture